Endoclita sericeus is a species of moth of the family Hepialidae first described by Charles Swinhoe in 1901. It is known from Java, Indonesia. Food plants for this species include Albizia, Camellia, Cinchona, Crotalaria, Manihot, Tectona, and Theobroma.

References

External links
"Endoclita Felder, 1874". Buffalo Museum of Science. Archived May 12, 2006.

Moths described in 1901
Hepialidae
Moths of Indonesia
Insects of Java